Venetsiya is a rural locality (a village) in Takarlikovsky Selsoviet, Dyurtyulinsky District, Bashkortostan, Russia. The population was 76 as of 2010. There is 1 street.

Geography 
Venetsiya is located 14 km northeast of Dyurtyuli (the district's administrative centre) by road. Dyurtyuli is the nearest rural locality.

References 

Rural localities in Dyurtyulinsky District